Jawali Saqawa (d. 1109), also known as Chavli Saqaveh, was a Turkish adventurer who was atabeg of Mosul from 1106–1109.  In 1104, Jawali held Baldwin II as prisoner until he was ransomed in 1108.  He had purloined Baldwin from Jikirmish of Mosul who, in turn, had taken him from Sökmen.  Jawali was designated successor to Jikirmish by Muhammad I Tapar when he attacked and killed his predecessor, thus becoming atabeg in 1106, seizing Mosul and his hostage Baldwin. Joscelin I, himself ransomed in 1107, started negotiations with Jawali over the release of Baldwin. Jawali demanded a ransom and the release of Muslim prisoners from Edessa. Muhammad later was unhappy with the growing power of Jawali and dispatched Mawdud to unseat him.  Expelled from Mosul, Jawali fled to the fortress of Qal’at Ja’bar, taking Baldwin with him. Jawali accepted a ransom offer by Joscelin and released Baldwin in the summer of 1108.  Mawdud became atabeg of Mosul in 1109.

References

Bibliography

 
 

1109 deaths
Atabegs
Rulers of Mosul
Muslims of the Crusades